Hadi Soua'an Al-Somaily (born December 30, 1976, in Ta'if) is a Saudi Arabian athlete. He won the first Saudi silver medal in the Olympics in the 400 metres hurdles, clocking a personal best time of 47.53 seconds in 2000 in Sydney. US sprinter Angelo Taylor won the race and the gold medal in 47.50 seconds.

Competition record

References
 

1976 births
Living people
Saudi Arabian male hurdlers
Athletes (track and field) at the 1996 Summer Olympics
Athletes (track and field) at the 2000 Summer Olympics
Athletes (track and field) at the 2004 Summer Olympics
Olympic athletes of Saudi Arabia
Olympic silver medalists for Saudi Arabia
Medalists at the 2000 Summer Olympics
Asian Games medalists in athletics (track and field)
Athletes (track and field) at the 1994 Asian Games
Athletes (track and field) at the 2002 Asian Games
Athletes (track and field) at the 2006 Asian Games
People from Taif
Olympic silver medalists in athletics (track and field)
Goodwill Games medalists in athletics
Asian Games gold medalists for Saudi Arabia
Medalists at the 2002 Asian Games
Competitors at the 2001 Goodwill Games
Islamic Solidarity Games competitors for Saudi Arabia
Islamic Solidarity Games medalists in athletics